Evelio de Jesús Hernández Guedez (born 18 June 1984) is a Venezuelan footballer who currently plays for Primera División club Metropolitanos as a midfielder.

International career
He made his international debut on 1 March 2007, against Mexico.

References

External links
 Evelio Hernández at Football Lineups
 
 

1984 births
Living people
Venezuelan footballers
Venezuela international footballers
Trujillanos FC players
Deportivo Táchira F.C. players
Zamora FC players
Deportivo Miranda F.C. players
Deportivo Anzoátegui players
Caracas FC players
Zulia F.C. players
Venezuelan Primera División players
Association football midfielders
People from San Felipe, Venezuela